Acherontia  ( or Αχεροντία) was a small town of ancient Apulia, near the frontiers of Lucania, situated about  south of Venusia, and  southeast of Ferentum. Its position on a lofty hill is alluded to by Horace in a well-known passage. The modern town of Acerenza retains the site as well as name of the ancient one. It is built on a hill of considerable elevation, precipitous on three sides, and affording only a very steep approach on the fourth. It seems to have been always but a small town, and is not mentioned by any ancient geographer; but the strength of its position gave it importance in a military point of view: and during the wars of the Goths against the generals of Justinian, it was occupied by Totila with a garrison, and became one of the chief strongholds of the Gothic leaders throughout the contest. Whether the reading of Acherunto in Livy, refers to the same place is disputed.

References

Populated places in ancient Apulia